Harnasie Hill is a steep-sided hill rising to  between Vauréal Peak and Martins Head in the southern portion of Krakow Peninsula, King George Island, in the South Shetland Islands, Antarctica. It was named "Wierch Harnasie" (Harnasie Hill) by the Polish Antarctic Expedition, 1980, after the opera Harnasie by Karol Szymanowski.

References

Hills of Antarctica
Poland and the Antarctic